Fairfield station is a commuter rail station on the Metro-North Railroad New Haven Line, located in Fairfield, Connecticut. The former station buildings are listed on the National Register of Historic Places as Fairfield Railroad Stations.

History

Old station buildings, now reused for other purposes, are adjacent to both platforms. The brick eastbound (south) station was built in 1882. It replaced a station burned by a fire, and "is typical of the substantial brick stations built at small-town stops throughout the state in the period. Whereas earlier stations had been small wood-frame buildings, often in a picturesque Gothic or Italianate style, the stations of the 1880s were brick" to be fire-resistant and were larger to accommodate larger waiting areas and other amenities.  They were "well-built but utilitarian" structures. The wooden westbound station "stands as an excellent example of the New Haven Railroad's 1890s passenger facilities" reflecting changed priorities.

The Budd M2 cars necessitated high level platforms, and the low-level platforms were replaced in 1972.

The two station buildings were listed on the National Register of Historic Places in 1989. The  listed area was defined to include the two stations and their immediate surroundings, but to exclude a passenger cross-over and stairway, and to exclude associated parking areas.

The ticket window in the westbound station building was closed on July 7, 2010.

Station layout
The station has two side platforms, each six cars (510 feet) long, serving the outer tracks of the four-track Northeast Corridor. Stairs connect the platforms to the Unquowa Road overpass at the east end of the station. Fairfield station is only partially accessible - while the platforms are fully accessible, there is no accessible route between the platforms.

The station has 1,216 parking spaces, 376 of which are owned by the state and operated by the town; the main lot is on the north side of the station.

See also
 National Register of Historic Places listings in Fairfield County, Connecticut

References

External links

Bureau of Public Transportation of the Connecticut Department of Transportation, "Condition Inspection for the Fairfield Station" report dated July 2002 
 Station House and Station from Google Maps Street View
 http://www.ct.gov/dot/lib/dot/documents/dpt/1_Station_Inspection_Summary_Report.pdf

Metro-North Railroad stations in Connecticut
Stations on the Northeast Corridor
Railroad stations in Fairfield County, Connecticut
Buildings and structures in Fairfield, Connecticut
Stations along New York, New Haven and Hartford Railroad lines
Railway stations on the National Register of Historic Places in Connecticut
Queen Anne architecture in Connecticut
Railway stations in the United States opened in 1848
National Register of Historic Places in Fairfield County, Connecticut
1848 establishments in Connecticut